Callipogonius is a genus of longhorn beetles of the subfamily Lamiinae, containing the following species:

Species
Callipogonius cornutus (Linsley, 1930)
Callipogonius hircinus (Bates, 1885)

References

Pogonocherini
Cerambycidae genera
Taxa named by Earle Gorton Linsley